Harry Arroyo (born October 25, 1957) is an American former professional boxer who held the IBF lightweight title from 1984 to 1985.

Early years 

Arroyo, of Puerto Rican descent, was born on the south side of Youngstown, Ohio, a steel-manufacturing center near the Pennsylvania border. As a child, he reportedly told his 15 siblings about his dream of becoming a nationally known fighter. In the 1980s, he became one of the most recognizable boxers on television and regularly appeared on the covers of boxing magazines. In 1984, Arroyo, with fellow Youngstown native Ray Mancini, was listed among the nation's top 10 contenders by the World Boxing Association. This was after Mancini had lost that organization's world title to Livingstone Bramble.

Boxing career 

Arroyo fought for nine years as an amateur boxer, winning several Golden Glove tournaments as well as eight AAU Regional Tournaments. As an amateur he had 110 wins and 15 losses. He worked up a record of 40 wins and 11 losses as a professional, and won the IBF's world lightweight title by beating Charlie "Choo Choo" Brown in the 14th round on April 15, 1984. Arroyo, a late substitute for Cornelius Boza Edwards, staggered Brown with two blows to the head, prompting referee Larry Hazzard to stop the fight. On September 1, 1984, Arroyo successfully defended his title against Charlie "White Lightning" Brown, in a bout held in Struthers, Ohio. The champion successfully defended his title once more before losing to Jimmy Paul on April 4, 1985.

Professional boxing record

Retirement 

Arroyo has expressed disappointment over the fact that he never had a chance to meet fellow Youngstown pugilist Ray "Boom Boom" Mancini in the ring. The possibility of a matchup between the two fighters emerged in the early 1980s, but circumstances intervened. Arroyo won the IBF title just two months before Mancini's first loss to Livingstone Bramble. Mancini took a break from boxing for several years after losing his title, and by the time he re-entered the ring, Arroyo's career had waned considerably. Both men were on hand, however, when fellow Youngstown native Kelly Pavlik took the WBC and WBO middleweight world championship in Atlantic City on September 29, 2007.

Retired from the ring, Arroyo is married and has five children.

Officiating career
After his retirement, Arroyo become a boxing referee, and has officiated dozens of fights, mainly in Ohio.

See also

List of lightweight boxing champions
List of Puerto Ricans
List of Puerto Rican boxing world champions

References

External links
 
 Officiating Record

Living people
1957 births
Boxers from Youngstown, Ohio
American sportspeople of Puerto Rican descent
American male boxers
Lightweight boxers
Light-welterweight boxers
Light-middleweight boxers
World lightweight boxing champions
International Boxing Federation champions